is a district located in Saitama Prefecture, Japan.

As of September 1, 2005, the district has an estimated population of 36,979 and a density of 2,498.58 persons per km2. The total area is 14.80 km2. (These numbers are excluding those of Fukiage, which merged with a city outside the district on October 1, 2005.)

Towns and villages
Ina

Merger
On October 1, 2005, the town of Fukiage merged into the city of Kōnosu.

Districts in Saitama Prefecture